Irvesuud FC is a Mongolian association football club currently competing in the  Mongolia Second League.

History
The club was founded in 2022 and competed in the National Amateur Cup that season. After topping its group, Irvesuud FC advanced to the final before ultimately losing to Capitron FC on penalties. The club received automatic promotion to the Mongolia Second League with its second-place finish.

Domestic history
Key

References

External links
MFF profile
Eleven Sports channel

Football clubs in Mongolia
2020s establishments in Mongolia